Yonglejiang Town is a town and the county seat of Anren in Hunan, China. The town was formed through the amalgamation of Heshi Township, Paishan Township, Junshan Township, Qingxi Town and Chengguan Town in 2012. Yonglejiang is located in the northern part of the county, it is bordered by Longshi Township, Dukou Township, You County and Hengdong County to the north, Chaling County to the east, Pailou Township and Lingguan Town to the south, Yangji Township, Leiyang City and Hengnan County to the west.

References

Anren County
County seats in Hunan
Towns of Chenzhou